Loka Brunn is a spa town located in Hällefors Municipality in Örebro County, Sweden, south of Grythyttan, and north of Karlskoga, at the southern shore of lake Norra Loken.

History 
Established during the middle ages, Loka Brunn, served as a resting site for pilgrims.
Granted mineral rights in 1720, by Conrad Ribbing, governor of Örebro County, in the historical province Västmanland, near the border of Värmland, surrounded by conifer forests, and described by Carl Linnaeus in 1746.

Since its establishment, it has served as a site for recovery, and treatments. In the 1700s, Gustav III stayed at Loka Brunn.

In the 19th century, people suffering from the effects of rheumatic disorders, sought treatment at Loka Brunn.

In 2007, the Spendrup family acquired Loka Brunn.

See also 

 Spendrups
 Ramlösa Hälsobrunn

References

Further reading 

Frih, Anna-Karin (2003). ”"Sjuk nästan jemt-": klorotiska flickor och kvinnor vid Loka och Porla brunn ca 1880-1910”. Kvinnor i Örebro län (2003):  sid. 111-126 : ill..  Libris 9649863

External links 

 Lokabrunn.se – homepage (in Swedish)

Springs of Sweden
Populated places in Hällefors Municipality